The Cole Nobody Knows is a documentary film about musician Freddy Cole, the younger brother of Eddie Cole, Ike Cole & Nat King Cole.

The film tells Mr. Cole's story through interviews with musicians Monty Alexander, Nancy Wilson, David “Fathead” Newman, John di Martino, H Johnson and Carl Anthony.  Photographed in Atlanta, New York City, Los Angeles, Switzerland & France, “The Cole Nobody Knows” also features live performance material with Freddy Cole and his quartet.

Directed by filmmaker Clay Walker, "The Cole Nobody Knows" has been featured in over 40 international film festivals and awarded the Cine Golden Eagle Award.  The film received its PBS premiere on WPSU Pennsylvania in December 2009.

References

External links
The Cole Nobody Knows online

The Film's Official Website
Freddy Cole's website

2006 films
American documentary films
2006 documentary films
Documentary films about jazz music and musicians
2000s English-language films
2000s American films